Golden Braid is a 1990 Australian film directed by Paul Cox, who later called it "quite a funny film, but very few people get it."

It was entirely funded by the Australian Film Commission.

References

External links

Golden Braid at Oz Movies

Copy of short story

1989 films
Australian fantasy films
Films based on works by Guy de Maupassant
Films directed by Paul Cox
1990s English-language films
1980s English-language films
Australian comedy-drama films
1990s Australian films